Lara McSpadden (born 2 April 1999) is an Australian basketball player for the Sydney Uni Flames in the  WNBL.

Career

WNBL
McSpadden began her professional career, in her home state of New South Wales, with the Sydney Uni Flames for the 2016–17 season. There she played under Cheryl Chambers and alongside the likes of Belinda Snell.

National team
McSpadden made her international debut at the 2015 FIBA Oceania Under-16 Championship for Women in New Zealand with the U17 Sapphires, where she helped them qualify for the world championship the following year. At the world championship, the Sapphires won their inaugural title in Spain. After snapping team USA's 28-game win streak at U17 level, Australia went on to take home Gold.

References

1999 births
Living people
Australian women's basketball players
Centers (basketball)
Basketball players from Sydney
Sydney Uni Flames players
Universiade gold medalists for Australia
Universiade medalists in basketball
Medalists at the 2019 Summer Universiade